is a Japanese former professional baseball utility player. He played for the Chunichi Dragons.

He is currently the second team infield defense and baserunning for the Chunichi Dragons in Japan's Western League.

Career
Watanabe was mostly used as a utility infielder for most of his career but captured a golden glove in 2004 as a regular. After Tyrone Woods was brought to the club, Watanabe's appearances became more limited to an off the bench role. 

After retirement, Watanabe has worked with the Dragons backroom mostly as a defensive specialist where he was most prominent as 1st base coach under Motonobu Tanishige's reign as manager. 

After Tanishige's sacking and the appointment of Shigekazu Mori as manager, Watanabe served as second team defensive coach before moving into a scorers role in 2018. Ahead of the 2020 season, Watanabe was brought back to the second team coaching staff by Tsuyoshi Yoda after the promotion of Masahiro Araki to the first team after the departure of Hiroshi Narahara to the Tohoku Rakuten Golden Eagles.

References

External links

1970 births
Living people
Baseball people from Kanagawa Prefecture
Baseball people from Yokohama
Japanese baseball players
Nippon Professional Baseball infielders
Nihon University alumni
Chunichi Dragons players